Renegade Animation is an American animation studio located in Glendale, California which currently specializes in Adobe Animate/Toon Boom animation. It was founded by Disney and Warner Bros. animator and director Darrell Van Citters and his business partner Ashley Postelwaite in July 1992 in Burbank, California. The studio previously produced Hi Hi Puffy AmiYumi for Cartoon Network, The Mr. Men Show for Chorion and The Tom and Jerry Show and Unikitty! for Warner Bros. Animation and is currently working on Tom and Jerry in New York for HBO Max.

History 
Renegade Animation initially produced several commercials and animated short films, beginning with the second "Hare Jordan" spot for Nike, which featured Bugs Bunny as his own alter-ego and Michael Jordan as Air Jordan, as well as numerous spots for Cheetos and Kellogg's, among others. In the mid-'90s, they moved into internet cartoons, and produced Will Ryan's Elmo Aardvark: Outer Space Detective.

They have since branched out into television, and are perhaps most well known as the producers of cartoon series Hi Hi Puffy AmiYumi, The Mr. Men Show and The Tom and Jerry Show, a series featuring Tom and Jerry. They also co-produced the live-action/Traditionally-animated telefilm Re-Animated with Appleday Pictures. Renegade also produced the 2007 direct-to-video Christmas film Christmas Is Here Again based on a story by Robert Zappia, although it since aired in syndication and on Hulu.

Filmography

Films

Interactive projects 
 Gargoyles (animation; 1995)
 Spider-Man Cartoon Maker (1995)
 X-Men Cartoon Maker (1996)
 Someone's in the Kitchen! (1996)
 101 Dalmatians: Escape from DeVil Manor (animation; 1997)
 Microsoft Office 2000 (Links assistant; 1999)

Short films 
 Captain Sturdy: "Back in Action!" (Cartoon Network pilot; 2001)
 Hi Hi Puffy AmiYumi (unaired pilot) (2002)
 Captain Sturdy: "The Originals" (Adult Swim pilot; 2003)
 A Dairy Tale (animation) (2004)
 Stitch's Great Escape! (animation) (2004)
 Disneyland: The First 50 Magical Years (animation) (2005)
 This Pretty Planet (2005)
 Sausage Party (2007) 
 Funny Face (short series) (2009)
 Book of Dragons (2D animation) (2011)
 ABCmouse.com (various digital shorts)
 Hardboiled Eggheads (Amazon pilot; 2014)
 DC Super Hero Girls (webseries; season 5) (2018)
 The JoJo and BowBow Show Show (Nickelodeon webseries; 2018)
 SCADstory (animation; 2019)

Commercials 

 Nike (1993)
 Golden Crisp (1993–1994)
 Trix Cereal (1993)
 Atari Jaguar (1993)
 Campbell's (1993)
 Pebbles (1994–1995)
 Colgate (1994)
 Esso (1995)
 Pepsi (1995)
 Virginia Lottery (1995)
 Apple Macintosh (1995)
 National Highway Traffic Safety Administration (1995)
 Scrubbing Bubbles (1995)
 Carl's Jr. (1996)
 Kraft Foods Inc. (1996)
 Barq's (1996)
 Taco Bell (1996–1997)
 Honey Smacks (1996–1997)
 Cheetos (1997–2000)
 Trix Yogurt (1997–1999)
 California Prune Board (1997)
 Cartoon Network (1997–1998, 2002)
 Midas (1998)
 McDonald's Singapore (1998)
 Bull's-Eye Barbecue Sauce (1998)
 SpaghettiOs (1998)
 Vlasic Pickles (1999)
 Village Pantry (1999)
 Cheese Nips (2001)
 Target (2001)
 Rice Krispies (2001)
 Dodge (2002)
 Cocoa Puffs (2004–2005)
 H-E-B (2006)
 Prego (2007)
 BulkRegister
 GEICO (2011)
 Wienerschnitzel (2014)
 KITH NYC (2020)
 Etihad Airways (2022)

References

External links 
 Official website

American animation studios
Entertainment companies established in 1992
Mass media companies established in 1992
Companies based in Glendale, California
1992 establishments in California